Asopao is a family of stews  that can be made with chicken, pork, beef, shrimp seafood, vegetables, or any combination of the above. Asopao is Puerto Rico's national soup and one of the most important gastronomic recipes in Puerto Rico.

Dominican Republic

Puerto Rico

A version said to be based on the Spanish rice dish arroz a la valenciana includes chicken, rabbit and a variety of seafood cooked in sherry wine. 

The chicken version (asopao de pollo) is usually served with plantain-dumplings. It's a common holiday dish for Christmas, and during Octavitas and Los Tres Reyes Magos celebrations. Asopao de pollo can also include beer, smocked ham, ham hock, corn on the cob with more smoky seasoning cumin, annatto and coriander seeds.

Asopao de marisco is second popular after asopao de pollo. It includes clams, shrimp, squid, octopus, fish, lobster, crab, scallops, and mussels.

Asopao de gandules replaces rice with pigeon peas. Meat usually a mix of longaniza, oxtail, and smoked meats, when done roasted pork is placed on top of the soup. Squash and plantain-dumplings are often included in the soup.

The plantains-dumplings that are popular with asopao de pollo and asopao de gandules are made from root vegetables, breadfruit, green banana, plantains, milk, eggs and flour or cornmeal. The dumplings are made into golf size balls and often seasoned with spices and herbs. They can be prepared a day in advance and fried.

Asopao is typically flavored with wine, broth, bay leaf and oregano, along with sofrito, olives, capers, and rice being the most important part. Garnish with sweet peas and severed with mojito isleño, bread, tostones and avocado.

In media
Asopao is mentioned in "Caribbean Conspiracy" by Brenda Conrad, about a story that takes place in Puerto Rico which was published in 1942 and printed as a weekly series in dozens of U.S. newspapers in 1943.

Asopao is mentioned in passing in the seventh episode of the third season of Netflix's series Daredevil, titled “Aftermath.”

Asopao is revealed as Dr. Hugh Culver's favorite dish in Season 2 Episode 8 of Star Trek: Discovery.

Asopao is made by the Puerto Rican sisters in the CW show Charmed.

References

Puerto Rican cuisine
Rice dishes
Puerto Rican soups
Seafood dishes
Meat dishes
Chicken soups
Christmas food
Epiphany (holiday)
Dominican Republic cuisine